A commemorative is an object made to memorialize something.

Commemorative may refer to:

 Commemorative coin, coins that issued to commemorate something
 Commemorative medal, a medal to commemorate something
 Commemorative plaque, a plate typically attached to surface and bearing text or an image related to an honoree
 Commemorative stamp, a postage stamp to honor something

See also
 Commemoration (disambiguation)
 Commemorative Air Force, a Texas-based organization dedicated to preserving and showing historical aircraft